Hound Green is a village in the Hart District of Hampshire, England. It is in the civil parish of Mattingley.  Its nearest town is Hook approximately 3 miles (4.5 km) south-west to the village.

Villages in Hampshire